Ina is a village in Jefferson County, Illinois, United States. The population was 2,338 as of the 2010 census. It is part of the Mount Vernon Micropolitan Statistical Area.

Geography
Ina is located along Illinois Route 37 which is the village's Main Street, and Interstate 57 runs through the west side of town, with access from Exit 83.

Ina is located on high ground between Casey Creek and Gun Creek, both tributaries of the Big Muddy River. The Big Muddy has been dammed to form Rend Lake, with arms of the lake extending up the two tributaries.

Ina is the home of the Big Muddy River Correctional Center. Rend Lake College, with an Ina mailing address, is outside the village limits to the southwest.

History
Many Cherokee families settled in Ina around 1840. They were apparently refugees from the Trail of Tears. In the 1800s, Ina was jokingly referred to as "the Cherokee Reservation".

Spring Garden prospered from 1848 until the Chicago and Eastern Illinois Railroad was built in 1905. After that, the population and business shifted over to the depots at Ina and Bonnie.

Crimes 
A famous murder case occurred in Ina in 1924, when Rev. Lawrence Hight and his lover Elsie Sweeten poisoned Sweeten's husband in July and Hight's wife in September. Autopsies revealed arsenic. Hight and Sweeten were both sent to prison. Elsie Sweeten was granted another trial and was later acquitted of murder and released from jail.

Over six decades later a quadruple homicide occurred outside of town. The victims were the Dardeen family, who lived in a mobile home on Illinois Route 37 just north of the Franklin County line. One evening in November 1987, the police came to the house since Keith Dardeen had not shown up for his job at the Rend Lake Water Conservancy District treatment plant that morning and did not answer phone calls.

Elaine had not been raped, valuable items remained in the house, and police found no reason why anyone might want to have killed the family. Serial killer Tommy Lynn Sells confessed to the crime after he was arrested in Texas in 2000; however, police and the other members of the Dardeen family did not completely believe his accounts, which he changed three times, and he did not seem to know any nonpublic information about the crime. He was never charged before his 2014 execution, and officially the Dardeens' killings remain unsolved.

Demographics

The following population figures for Ina were greatly influenced by the approximately 1,850 male inmates who were included from the Big Muddy River Correctional Center, which had been annexed to the original village. (The population of the village outside of the Correctional Center was approximately 600 people.) As of the census of 2000, there were officially 2,455 people, 199 households, and 140 families residing in the village. The racial makeup of the village was 55.15% White, 41.79% African American, 0.45% Native American, 0.24% Asian, 2.12% from other races, and 0.24% from two or more races. Hispanic or Latino of any race were 6.48% of the population.

There were 199 households, out of which 26.6% had children under the age of 18 living with them, 57.8% were married couples living together, 10.6% had a female householder with no husband present, and 29.6% were non-families. 25.1% of all households were made up of individuals, and 15.6% had someone living alone who was 65 years of age or older.  The average household size was 2.46 and the average family size was 2.95.

In the village, the population was spread out, with 5.1% under the age of 18, 18.7% from 18 to 24, 54.9% from 25 to 44, 16.7% from 45 to 64, and 4.5% who were 65 years of age or older.  The median age was 34 years. For every 100 females, there were 874.2 males.  For every 100 females age 18 and over, there were 1,082.2 males.  These last two statistics were heavily influenced by the approximately 1850 male inmates in the Big Muddy River Correctional Center.

The median income for a household in the village was $24,453 and the median income for a family was $32,500.  Males had a median income of $33,950 versus $20,625 for females.  The per capita income for the village was $8,596.  About 10.4% of families and 19.2% of the population were below the poverty line, including 26.4% of those under age 18 and 21.0% of those age 65 or over.

Education
Spring Garden School District 178 operates area schools, including Spring Garden Elementary School (with a Mount Vernon postal address but outside of the city) and Spring Garden Middle School in Ina.

References

Villages in Jefferson County, Illinois
Villages in Illinois
Mount Vernon, Illinois micropolitan area
19th century Cherokee history
Populated places established in 1840